The 1920–21 St. Francis Terriers men's basketball team represented St. Francis College during the 1920–21 NCAA men's basketball season. The team was coached by Brother Philip. The team was not part of a conference and played as division I independents.

The 1920–21 team finished with a .823 record at 14–3. This was Brother Philip's last year as the head coach of St. Francis College.

Roster

Schedule and results

|-
!colspan=12 style="background:#0038A8; border: 2px solid #CE1126;;color:#FFFFFF;"| Regular Season

 
 
  

|-

References

St. Francis Brooklyn Terriers men's basketball seasons
St. Francis
Saint Francis
Saint Francis